Andrea Giocondi (born 17 January 1969 in Tivoli) is an Italian middle distance runner who specialized in the 800 metres.

Biography
He finished seventh at the 1995 World Championships in Athletics in Gothenburg, and won the silver medal at the 1995 Summer Universiade in Fukuoka. His personal best 800 m time is 1:44.78 minutes.

Olympic results

National titles
He has won 4 national championship titles.
800 metres (1996, 2001)
800 metres indoor (1999)
1500 metres indoor (1996)

See also
 Italian all-time lists - 800 metres
 Annalisa Minetti

References

External links
 

1969 births
Living people
People from Tivoli, Lazio
Italian male middle-distance runners
Athletics competitors of Fiamme Gialle
Athletes (track and field) at the 1996 Summer Olympics
Olympic athletes of Italy
Paralympic sighted guides
Universiade medalists in athletics (track and field)
World Athletics Championships athletes for Italy
Universiade silver medalists for Italy
Medalists at the 1995 Summer Universiade
Sportspeople from the Metropolitan City of Rome Capital